The 2008 Fluminense Football Club season was the 94th season in Fluminense's existence, and their 92nd in Brazil's first division. They spent 1 season in Brazil's second division in 1998 & another season in Brazil's third division in 1999.

Squad

Transfers
For recent transfers, see Brazilian Football Transfers 2008

Statistics

Last updated on 2008-07-07

Season

Campeonato Carioca 2008

Taça Guanabara 2008

Matches

Taça Guanabara 2008 Semi-Final

Classification

League table

Season

Campeonato Carioca 2008

Taça Rio 2008

Matches

Taça Rio 2008 Semi-Final

Taça Rio 2008 Final

Classification

League table

Copa Libertadores 2008
Please see Copa Libertadores 2008 for performances by Fluminense

Campeonato Brasileiro Série A

Matches

Classification

League table

Results summary

Pld = Matches played; W = Matches won; D = Matches drawn; L = Matches lost;

Results by round

External links
First Squad (pt)
Fixtures and results (pt)
Fixtures and results • UOL.com.br (pt)
Fixtures • Globo.com (pt)

Brazilian football clubs 2008 season
2008